Olivia Margarette Brown (born April 10, 1960) is an American actress, best-known for her role as detective Trudy Joplin in the NBC crime drama series Miami Vice (1984–1989).

Life and career
Brown was born in Frankfurt, West Germany, and raised in Livonia, Michigan. Her family eventually moved to California, where she graduated from Santa Monica High School.

Brown made her big screen debut appearing in an supporting role in the 1982 action comedy film 48 Hrs. She later appeared in Streets of Fire (1984), Throw Momma from the Train (1987), Identity Crisis (1989), Man's Best Friend (1993) and All Tied Up (1994). From 1984 to 1989, she starred as Detective Trudy Joplin in the NBC crime drama series Miami Vice.

Brown guest-starred on T.J. Hooker, The Love Boat, Family Matters, The Fresh Prince of Bel-Air and Sister, Sister. She had recurring roles on Hill Street Blues, Designing Women, Lois & Clark: The New Adventures of Superman, Beverly Hills, 90210, Moesha and 7th Heaven. Brown also was regular in the NBC sitcom Dear John from 1990 to 1991.

Personal life
Olivia was married to Mykelti Williamson for two years, from 1983 until their divorce in 1985. She is currently married to James Okonkwo, with whom she has two children.

Her brother is Steve Brown, who played for the Houston Oilers of the NFL during the late 1980s.

Filmography

Film

Television

References

External links
 
 

1960 births
Living people
20th-century American actresses
Actresses from Michigan
African-American actresses
American film actresses
American television actresses
People from Livonia, Michigan
20th-century African-American women
20th-century African-American people
21st-century African-American people
21st-century African-American women